The Djebel Onk mine is a large mine located in the Tébessa Province. Djebel Onk represents one of the largest phosphates reserve in Algeria having estimated reserves of 2.8 billion tonnes of ore grading 24% P2O5.

References 

Phosphate mines in Algeria